Begonia ynesiae is a species of plant in the family Begoniaceae. It is endemic to Ecuador.  Its natural habitats are subtropical or tropical high-altitude shrubland and subtropical or tropical high-altitude grassland. It is threatened by habitat loss.

References

ynesiae
Endemic flora of Ecuador
Vulnerable plants
Taxonomy articles created by Polbot